Sharbot Lake Provincial Park is a park under the auspices of Ontario Parks in the municipality of Central Frontenac, Frontenac County in Eastern Ontario, Canada.

This recreation class campground has 194 camp sites, 178 of which are treed. In 2010 the campground hosted more than twenty-nine thousand visitors, of which more than twenty-six thousand were overnight campers. Although the park is on the northwest shore of Sharbot Lake, it is mostly along the shore line of the neighbouring Black Lake, having two sandy beaches on this latter lake.

Ontario Highway 7 parallels much of the park.

See also
List of Canadian provincial parks - for parks in other Canadian provinces.
List of Ontario parks

References

External links

Provincial parks of Ontario
Protected areas of Frontenac County
Year of establishment missing